Corey Stevens (born August 6, 1954) is an American blues guitarist from Centralia, Illinois, United States.

Biography
Stevens began playing guitar at age 11 and moved to Los Angeles after graduating from Southern Illinois University at Carbondale, to pursue a career in the music business. Stevens worked as a school teacher for the Los Angeles Unified School District for ten years before signing a recording contract with the independent label, Eureka Records. He released his debut album in 1995, garnering comparisons to Stevie Ray Vaughan and Eric Clapton, and scored a rock radio hit with the single, "Blue Drops of Rain." "One More Time" from his 1997 follow up, Road To Zen, was his highest charting single. It reached the  top ten in Radio & Records and number 22 on the Billboard Mainstream Rock chart.

Discography
Blue Drops of Rain (Eureka/Discovery, 1995) U.S. Blues number 7
Road to Zen (Eureka/Discovery, 1997) U.S. Blues number 4
Getaway (Eureka, 2000)
Bring on the Blues (Fuel 2000/Varèse Sarabande, 2003) U.S. Blues number 15
Alone at Last (Self-released, 2006)
Mean and Lean (Self-released, 2006) - reissue of Getaway
Albertville (Ruf Records, 2007)
Myth Live (Self-released, 2008) -2CD
The Dreaming Man (Self-released, 2010)
Rumors in the Ether (Self-released, 2014)
The Party's Gonna Go On (Self-released, 2018)

Singles
 1996 "It's Over" from Blue Drops of Rain
 1996 "Blue Drops of Rain" from Blue Drops of Rain
 1996 "Crosscut Saw" from Blue Drops of Rain
 1997 "Road to Zen" from Road to Zen
 1997 "One More Time" (US Main Rock number 22) from Road to Zen
 1998 "My Neighborhood" from Road to Zen
 2003 "Lonesome Road Blues" from Bring on the Blues
 2003 "Triple Jack" from Bring on the Blues
 2003 "You're So Evil" from Bring on the Blues

Music videos

References

1954 births
Living people
American blues guitarists
American male guitarists
American blues singers
American male singers
Singers from Illinois
Guitarists from Illinois
Discovery Records artists
Ruf Records artists